The 1925 Harvard Crimson football team was an American football team that represented Harvard University as an independent during the 1925 college football season. In its seventh season under head coach Bob Fisher, the team compiled a 4–3–1 record and outscored opponents by a total of 118 to 88. The team played its home games at Harvard Stadium in Boston.

Schedule

References

Harvard
Harvard Crimson football seasons
Harvard Crimson football
1920s in Boston